Geoffrey Lewis Lewis CMG FBA (19 June 1920 – 12 February 2008) was an English Professor of the Turkish language at the University of Oxford. He was well known as the author of Teach Yourself Turkish and academic books about Turkish and Turkey.

Early life and education
Lewis was born in London, England in 1920 and educated at University College School and St John's College, Oxford (MA 1945, DPhil 1950; James Mew Arabic Scholar, 1947).

At St John's College Lewis initially studied classics. With the outbreak of the Second World War, he served from 1940 to 1945 as a radar operator in the Royal Air Force. Posted primarily in Libya and Egypt, he returned to Oxford afterwards and switched his studies to Arabic and Persian.

He initially studied Turkish as a hobby: Turkish was not taught at Oxford before Lewis was appointed to his academic post.

Career
 Lecturer in Turkish, 1950–54, Senior Lecturer in Islamic Studies, 1954–64, Senior Lecturer in Turkish, 1964–86, Oxford
 Fellow, St Antony's College, Oxford, 1961.
 Visiting Professor: Robert College, Istanbul, 1959–68; Princeton University, 1970–71, 1974; UCLA, 1975
 British Academy Leverhulme Visiting Professor, Turkey, 1984
 Professor of Turkish, University of Oxford, 1986.

Honours
 Vice-President, 1972–2003, President, 2003–2008, Anglo-Turkish Society
 Turkish Government Certificate of Merit, 1973
 FBA 1979
 President, British Society for Middle Eastern Studies, 1981–83 (award for outstanding contributions for many years to Middle Eastern studies in UK, 2005). 
 President, B'nai B'rith Oxford Lodge, 1989
 Turkish Ministry of Foreign Affairs Exceptional Service Plaque, 1991
 Order of Merit of the Republic of Turkey, 1998
 Honorary doctorates from the University of Istanbul and the Boğaziçi University
 CMG, 1999
 Gunnar Jarring Lecturer, Stockholm, 2002

Publications
 Teach Yourself Turkish, 1953, 2nd edition 1989
 Modern Turkey, 1955, 4th edition 1974
 (trans., with annotations) Katib Chelebi, The Balance of Truth, 1957
 Plotiniana Arabica, 1959
 (with Barbara Hodge) A Study in Education for International Misunderstanding (Cyprus School History Textbooks), 1966
Turkish Grammar, 1967, Second edition 2000. Oxford: Oxford University Press. .
 (with M. S. Spink) Albucasis on Surgery and Instruments, 1973
 The Book of Dede Korkut, 1974
 The Atatürk I Knew, 1981
 Thickhead and other Turkish Stories, 1988
 Just a Diplomat, 1992
 The Turkish Language Reform: A Catastrophic Success. 1999 Oxford: Oxford University Press

References

1920 births
2008 deaths
20th-century linguists
Alumni of St John's College, Oxford
British expatriates in Egypt
British expatriates in Libya
British Jews
Companions of the Order of St Michael and St George
Fellows of St Antony's College, Oxford
Fellows of the British Academy
Linguists from the United Kingdom
Linguists of Turkish
People educated at University College School
Recipients of the Order of Merit of the Republic of Turkey
Royal Air Force airmen
Royal Air Force personnel of World War II
Turkologists